This is a list of presidents (Speakers) of the Legislative Chamber of the Great Khural of Tuva from 2002:

Sources

Lists of legislative speakers in Russia
Presidents